John Hawarden was the second Principal of Brasenose College, Oxford.

Hawarden was born in Lancashire. He held the living at Steeple Aston; and was Principal of Brasenose from 1548 to 1565.

Notes

 

16th-century English people
Principals of Brasenose College, Oxford
People from Lancashire (before 1974)